The Rabbit of Paris Métro (French: Lapin du métro parisien), also known as Serge the Rabbit (Serge le lapin), is a fictional character that has been used as a mascot by the RATP Group since the 1970s to promote child safety in the Paris Métro. The rabbit is depicted on stickers warning passengers against placing their fingers on the doors when they are opening. Its design has changed over time.
 
The first version was drawn by Anne LeLagadec in 1977. The rabbit is a symbol of the Metro and has an official Twitter account.

References 

Paris Métro
Fictional rabbits and hares